Michael McIntyre's Big World Tour is a comedy tour by British comedian Michael McIntyre. The tour began in Ta' Qali at the Malta Fairs and Conventions Centre on 21 April 2017, and concluded in New York City, United States at the Radio City Music Hall on 1 February 2020.

McIntyre sold 837,197 tickets for his tour, across 242 shows in 20 countries.

Background and development
Following the success of his previous tours, most recently "Happy and Glorious", a world tour was announced in 2017. Tickets for the UK shows went on sale on 5 May 2017. A high demand prompted many extra dates to be added at numerous venues and locations. Shows in Australia and New Zealand sold out in record time, selling out five arena shows in three days. As of December 2019, the tour is set to consist of 121 shows in total; 93 in Europe, 14 in Oceania, 5 in North America, 3 in Africa and 6 in Asia.

Tour dates

References

Comedy tours